Luis Milla Aspas (born 12 March 1966) is a Spanish former footballer who played as a defensive midfielder, currently manager of Indonesian club Persib Bandung.

He represented three clubs – including Barcelona and Real Madrid – in a 16-year-professional career, where he won three La Liga titles (one with the former and two with the latter) and amassed totals of 298 matches and six goals.

Milla later worked as a manager, being in charge of Spain's youth teams for several years.

Playing career
Milla was born in Teruel, Aragon. After finishing his development with FC Barcelona he made his La Liga debut in 1984–85, scoring in his only appearance of the season against Real Zaragoza as Barça pitched in a team majorly composed of youth players due to a general professional's strike.

Definitely promoted to the first team in 1988, Milla would be involved two years later in a sour contract renewal dispute with the board of directors and manager Johan Cruyff, which eventually finished with his free transfer to Real Madrid. He was seriously injured in his debut campaign, but bounced to back to be an important first-team element in the conquest of two leagues and one Copa del Rey, being fairly used even after the 1994 purchase of Fernando Redondo.

Milla finished his career in June 2001 after four years at Valencia CF, with more than 400 official appearances as a professional. Over a three-month period beginning in late 1989, he earned himself three caps for the Spain national team, the first against Hungary in a 1990 FIFA World Cup qualifier.

Coaching career
Milla was first involved in professional coaching in 2007–08, assisting former Barcelona and Madrid teammate Michael Laudrup at Getafe CF. In the ensuing summer he was named the national under-19's manager, after Vicente del Bosque's appointment as the senior manager.

In Milla's first tournament, the 2009 UEFA European championship, the team did not progress through the group stage. In the 2010 edition in France, however, he led Spain to the final, which ended in defeat to the hosts.

Later in the same year, Milla replaced Juan Ramón López Caro at the helm of the under-21 side. Despite finding a delicate situation upon his arrival, he managed to qualify for the 2011 European championship after defeating Croatia in a two-legged play-off.

In the final stages in Denmark, Milla led the Spanish under-21s to their third title, after only conceding two goals in five games (four wins and only one draw). He was sacked after his team failed to qualify from the group phase at the 2012 Summer Olympics.

In February 2013, Milla was appointed at UAE Pro League's Al Jazira Club. His first match in charge was a 3–1 loss at Tractor Sazi F.C. in the group stage of the AFC Champions League.

Milla returned to Spain in the 2015 off-season, signing as Segunda División club CD Lugo head coach and resigning in late February 2016 in unclear circumstances. The following season, in the same capacity, he joined Zaragoza also at that level, being dismissed after only four months in charge and six matches without a win.

On 21 January 2017, Milla succeeded Alfred Riedl at the helm of the Indonesia national team by signing a two-year deal. In October 2018, he had his contract terminated by the Football Association of Indonesia.

On 19 August 2022, Milla was announced as the new manager of Persib Bandung.

Personal life
Milla's son, also named Luis, is also a footballer and a midfielder.

Managerial statistics

Honours

Player
Barcelona
La Liga: 1984–85
Copa del Rey: 1989–90
European Cup Winners' Cup: 1988–89

Real Madrid
La Liga: 1994–95, 1996–97
Copa del Rey: 1992–93
Supercopa de España: 1993

Valencia
Copa del Rey: 1998–99
UEFA Intertoto Cup: 1998
UEFA Champions League runner-up: 1999–2000, 2000–01

Manager
Spain U21
UEFA European Under-21 Championship: 2011

Spain U19
UEFA European Under-19 Championship runner-up: 2010

Individual
 Liga 1 Coach of the Month: December 2022, January 2023

References

External links

1966 births
Living people
People from Teruel
Sportspeople from the Province of Teruel
Spanish footballers
Footballers from Aragon
Association football midfielders
La Liga players
Segunda División players
Segunda División B players
FC Barcelona C players
FC Barcelona players
FC Barcelona Atlètic players
Real Madrid CF players
Valencia CF players
Spain international footballers
Spanish football managers
Segunda División managers
Tercera División managers
CD Lugo managers
Real Zaragoza managers
UAE Pro League managers
Al Jazira Club managers
Persib Bandung managers
Spain national under-21 football team managers
Spanish Olympic coaches
Indonesia national football team managers
Spanish expatriate football managers
Expatriate football managers in the United Arab Emirates
Expatriate football managers in Indonesia
Spanish expatriate sportspeople in Indonesia
Spanish expatriate sportspeople in the United Arab Emirates